PRAXIS: The Fletcher Journal of Human Security is an annual peer-reviewed academic journal covering human security that was established in 1981. It is published by The Fletcher School of Law and Diplomacy (Tufts University). In 2012 it became an online-only journal.

The journal covers a different theme each year. It is produced by Fletcher students in coordination with the school's Institute for Human Security.

References

External links
 

International relations journals
Publications established in 1981
English-language journals
Annual journals
Tufts University
Academic journals edited by students
Open access journals